Richard Leveridge Hoxie (August 7, 1844 – April 29, 1930) was a brigadier general in the United States Army.

Biography
Hoxie was born on August 7, 1844, in New York City. In 1878 Hoxie married the noted sculptor Vinnie Ream. Together they had a son, Richard Ream Hoxie. Vinne Ream died in 1914. In 1917 he married Ruth Norcross. He died on April 29, 1930, in Miami, Florida, Ruth survived him and died in 1959. Both Vinnie and Ruth are buried with him at Arlington National Cemetery.

Career
Hoxie originally enlisted in the Union Army during the American Civil War. He served in the 1st Iowa Volunteer Infantry Regiment from 1861 until 1864. Following the war, Hoxie graduated from the United States Military Academy and was commissioned a second lieutenant in the United States Army in 1868, and retired as a brigadier general in 1908. During his time in the Army he served in the United States Army Corps of Engineers and be regarded as an expert on fortifications.

References

Military personnel from New York City
United States Army generals
Union Army soldiers
People of Iowa in the American Civil War
American military personnel of the Spanish–American War
United States Military Academy alumni
Burials at Arlington National Cemetery
1844 births
1930 deaths
Vinnie Ream